The Magic Eye is a 1918 American silent drama film directed by Rae Berger and starring Henry A. Barrows, Claire Du Brey and Zoe Rae.

Cast
 Henry A. Barrows as John Bowman
 Claire Du Brey as Mrs. Bowman
 Zoe Rae as Shirley Bowman
 Charles Hill Mailes as Sam Bullard 
 William A. Carroll as Jack 
 Elwood Bredell as Cordy

References

Bibliography
 John T. Soister, Henry Nicolella & Steve Joyce. American Silent Horror, Science Fiction and Fantasy Feature Films, 1913-1929. McFarland, 2014.

External links
 

1918 films
1918 drama films
1910s English-language films
American silent feature films
Silent American drama films
American black-and-white films
Universal Pictures films
Films directed by Rae Berger
1910s American films